The Mercedes-Benz Vario (model designation BM667/668/670) is a full-size commercial heavy van manufactured by Mercedes-Benz between 1996 and 2013.

History
The Vario was launched in 1996 as a facelifted version of the Mercedes-Benz T2.

The bodyshell remained relatively unchanged throughout its 17-year production life. The Vario proved a popular base chassis for minibuses and mini-coaches. When new regulations required disabled access, a model with a wheelchair lift was made available.

The Vario was fitted with several types of Mercedes-Benz engines. Pre-2000 vehicles used a 5-cylinder OM602LA (2874 cm3) and 4-cylinder OM904LA (4250 cm3), turbocharged and intercooled diesel engine. From September 2000, Vario 618D/818D models were equipped with a 4.2-liter turbo diesel engine with intercooler and direct injection with an output of 136 or 150 hp and torque of 520 or 580 Nm, respectively. The most powerful was a 177 hp, 675Nm engine.

With the introduction of the Euro 4 emission standards, the Vario began to be equipped with OM904LA series BlueTec4 turbocharged and intercooled engine with working volume of 4250 cm3 and a power of 129, 156 or 177 hp. Set of new manual gearboxes, new automatic gearbox and some optional equipment was added to portfolio.

Two types of gearboxes were available, a 5-speed manual (later 6-speed) and on buses, an Allison AT 545 4-speed automatic (later an Allison LCT 1000 5-speed). Maximum payload was 4.4 tons with a load volume of 17.4 cubic meters. A 4x4 model was also available. All models had a suspension on parabolic leaf springs, all ventilated disc brakes and power steering.

On 27 September 2013, the last Vario rolled off the production line in Ludwigsfelde. Between 1996 and 2013, 90,743 units were manufactured.<ref name="LastVarioMyVan1" /  The Vario was succeeded in Daimler Trucks' model range by heavier versions of the Mercedes-Benz Sprinter and lighter versions of the Mercedes-Benz Atego.

Engines

Gallery

References

Notes

Bibliography

External links

Product Guide (in German) Mercedes-Benz

Vario
Vario
Police vehicles
Vans
Minibuses
Vehicles introduced in 1996
1990s cars
2000s cars
2010s cars